The year 2015 was the 6th year in the history of the Road Fighting Championship, an MMA promotion based in South Korea. 2015 started with Road FC 021: Champions day and ended with Road FC 027: In China.

List of events

Road FC 027: In China 

Xiaomi Road FC 027: In China was an MMA event held by Road FC on December 26, 2015, at the Shanghai Oriental Sports Center in Shanghai, China.

Results

Road FC 026 

360GAME Road FC 026 was an MMA event held by Road FC on October 9, 2015, at the Jangchung Gymnasium in Seoul, South Korea.

Results

Road FC 025 

360GAME Road FC 025 was an MMA event held by Road FC on August 22, 2015, at the Wonju Chiak Gymnasium in Wonju, Gangwon, South Korea.

Results

Road FC 024: In Japan 

360GAME Road FC 024: In Japan was an MMA event held by Road FC on July 25, 2015, at the Ariake Coliseum in Tokyo, Japan.

Results

Road FC 023 

Goobne Chicken Road FC 023 was an MMA event held by Road FC on May 2, 2015, at the Jangchung Gymnasium in Seoul, South Korea.

Results

Road FC 022 

Goobne Chicken Road FC 022 was an MMA event held by Road FC on March 21, 2015, at the Jangchung Gymnasium in Seoul, South Korea.

Results

Road FC 021: Champions Day 

Goobne Chicken Road FC 021: Champions Day was an MMA event held by Road FC on February 1, 2015, at the Jangchung Gymnasium in Seoul, South Korea.

Results

See also
 List of Road FC events
 List of Road FC champions
 List of current Road FC fighters
 List of current mixed martial arts champions

References 

Road Fighting Championship events
2015 in mixed martial arts
2015 in South Korean sport
2015 in Asian sport